The Brain/MINDS (Brain Mapping by Integrated Neurotechnologies for Disease Studies) is a Japanese project sponsored by the Ministry of Education, Culture, Sports, Science, and Technology of Japan (MEXT) in 2014, then by the Japan Agency for Medical Research and Development (AMED) as of 2015. The project was launched in June 2014  for a 10-year duration.

The Brain/MINDS Project studies focuses on three areas:
 The study of the brain of the common marmoset – a non-human primate. This is led by Hideyuki Okano of the RIKEN Center for Brain Science (formerly "RIKEN Brain Science Institute") and the Keio University School of Medicine.
 Developing technologies for brain mapping; led by Atsushi Miyawaki, also of the RIKEN Center for Brain Science.
 Human brain mapping. This is led by Kiyoto Kasai of the University of Tokyo's  Graduate School of Medicines.

References

External links
 Official Website of Brain/MINDS project
 The Brain/MINDS Dataportal, dedicated for sharing the data and knowledge being produced in the Brain/MINDS project

Emerging technologies
Government research
Neuroinformatics
Research in Japan
Neuroscience projects